The square mile (abbreviated as sq mi and sometimes as mi2) is an imperial and US unit of measure for area. One square mile is an area equal to the area of a square with sides of length one mile.

Equivalents 
One square mile is equal to:
4,014,489,600 square inches

One square mile is also equivalent to:

Similarly-named units

Miles square 
Square miles should not be confused with miles square, a square region with each side having a length of the value given.

Section 
In the United States Public Land Survey System, "square mile" is an informal synonym for section.

References

 Formula Conversion, Square miles to numerous area units with algebraic steps and unit cancellation shown

Units of area
Customary units of measurement in the United States
Imperial units